Thérèse Plummer (born circa 1978) is an American voiceover actress and has narrated over 450 audiobooks.

Personal life 
Plummer is the fifth-born of eight kids. Her father was a professional actor, and her mother was a librarian.

On June 11, 2021, Plummer was involved in a car crash with a drunk driver, through which she sustained multiple injuries and required surgeries.

Plummer presently works in New York City and lives with her husband (Brian) and stepson on the East Coast of the United States.

Education and career 
Plummer studied psychology and theatre at King's College, then worked with kids in crisis and mental health disorders. In this position, she began to see acting a form of therapy.

Later, Plummer worked a day job at a financial firm in New York City and landed some acting jobs off-Broadway. During this time, she took a course in audiobook recordings with Robin Miles, who told Plummer she should record books professionally. With Miles's help, Plummer gained new skills and began auditioning for roles circa 2005.

Awards and honors

Awards

Honors

Filmography

References

External links 
 Official website

King's College (Pennsylvania) alumni
21st-century American actresses
1970s births
Living people
Audiobook narrators